Jan-Olof Wannius (born 15 May 1942) is a Swedish equestrian. He competed in the individual jumping event at the 1976 Summer Olympics.

References

1942 births
Living people
Swedish male equestrians
Olympic equestrians of Sweden
Equestrians at the 1976 Summer Olympics
Sportspeople from Stockholm